Kisiljevo (Serbian Cyrillic: Кисиљево) is a village in north-east Serbia (Braničevo District), located at municipality Veliko Gradište (Велико Градиште). The village is populated with 704 inhabitants (2002. census). Kisiljevo is mentioned extensively in the novel An Uncertain Place by Fred Vargas. The town was once famous for its story about Petar Blagojevich, a man who was reportedly thought to have been a vampire who killed 9 people.

References

Populated places in Braničevo District